Xerxes is a comedy TV series based in Sweden, about the adventures of three young men. It originally aired over Kanal 1 from 21 October to 27 November 1988. It was also broadcast in the UK on Channel 4.

Cast
Benny Haag - Xerxes
Joakim Borjlind - Tony
Kalle Westerdahl - Pekka
Gunilla Larsson - Annsofi
Thomas Roos - Tommy
Sara Brandt - Monika
Yvonne Lombard - Dagmar
Marianne Stjernqvist - Hjördis
Helge Skoog - Lundin
Jan Blomberg - Winstedt
Johanna Friberg - Nina
Ulla Skoog - Eva
Charlott Strandberg - Sussi
Claire Wikholm - Carina
Suzanne Reuter - Yvonne
Camilla Malmquist -  Jenny
Denise Lopez - Linda

References

1988 Swedish television series debuts
1988 Swedish television series endings
Sveriges Television original programming
Swedish children's television series
Channel 4 original programming